Gaston Dorren is a Dutch language expert, journalist, and writer.  He was born in Valkenburg aan de Geul, Netherlands and currently resides in Amersfoort, Netherlands with his wife Marleen Bekker.  Dorren is a polyglot who is able to speak six different languages and read nine more.  Dorren has achieved a modicum of international success, with Lingo being published in 12 different languages  and Babel in 15.  He also developed an app called The Language Lovers Guide to Europe, but it is no longer available.

Dorren wrote his most recent work, Babel, entirely in both English and Dutch himself.    The book was awarded the Dutch Language Book Prize 2019 by the language magazine Onze Taal and the Belgian-Dutch cultural association ANV.  His works have received positive reviews from publications such as Kirkus Reviews, The Guardian, The Wall Street Journal, and BBC

Bibliography

This bibliography only covers the books that have been written by Dorren, not the abundance of articles for various blogs, websites and magazines throughout Europe.

References

External links
 Language Writer

1965 births
Living people
20th-century Dutch male writers
20th-century Dutch journalists
21st-century Dutch male writers
21st-century Dutch journalists
People from Valkenburg aan de Geul
People from Amersfoort